John Michael Alt (born May 30, 1962) is a former professional American football offensive tackle in the National Football League (NFL). He played his entire NFL career with the Kansas City Chiefs from 1984 to 1996. A graduate of Columbia Heights (MN) High School, he played his college years at the University of Iowa.

After retiring from the NFL, Alt began assistant coaching at Cretin-Derham Hall High School in Saint Paul, Minnesota, working with the offensive line. He then went to Totino-Grace High School to coach the offensive line when his son Joe started playing there.

Alt's son, Mark, was selected 53rd overall in the 2010 NHL Entry Draft by the Carolina Hurricanes, and currently plays hockey for the Colorado Avalanche. Alt’s other son, Joe, is an All-American offensive tackle for Notre Dame.

References

External links
KC Hall of Fame - John Alt

1962 births
Living people
American Conference Pro Bowl players
American football offensive tackles
German players of American football
Iowa Hawkeyes football players
Kansas City Chiefs players
Sportspeople from Stuttgart
Ed Block Courage Award recipients